Robert Lewis (born 20 November 1987) is a Welsh rugby union player.

A scrum-half, he has represented Wales at Under18, Under19 and at Under20 level and was selected for the Wales Sevens squad in 2007, in which he competed in four tournaments, – Adelaide, Wellington, Hong Kong and San Diego. He was a key figure for Wales U19s, helping them win the Under19 Six Nations Championship Grand Slam and was Wales's top try scorer in the tournament. The same year he represented Wales U19 at the Junior World Cup in Dubai.

Robert came through the Newport Gwent Dragons Academy learning his trade with Ebbw Vale RFC and made his debut for the region in December 2007, coming off the bench away to Munster. He would go on to make a further 14 appearances for the Newport Gwent Dragons gaining Celtic League, LV Cup and four Heineken Cup experiences. Scoring a try in the Christmas period derby win over the Ospreys.

In May 2009 Lewis joined London Welsh and made a total of 88 appearances in three seasons and in 2011–2012 he played a major role in London Welsh winning the English Championship, beating Cornish Pirates in the two leg final and gaining promotion to the Aviva Premiership. During Lewis’s first spell at London Welsh RFC he represented The Barbarians, helping them to a narrow victory over the Combined Services at Aldershot RFC. 

In July 2012 he joined Cardiff Blues but in the November he returned to London Welsh who were then competing in the Premiership. Lewis again played a major role in London Welsh winning the English Championship for a second time in 2013–2014 and went on to play in a total of 136 league games making him the second highest in league appearances in the club's history after Matt Corker.

Following the unfortunate financial situation at London Welsh and its loss of a licence to continue to play in the RFU Greene King Championship, Rob returned to Ebbw Vale RFC in January 2017. On 16 March 2017 Birmingham Moseley Rugby Club announced that Lewis was the first new signing for the club's 2017–2018 National League 1 campaign. In his second season at Birmingham Moseley Lewis was announced as Captain, alongside Buster Lawrence and Sam Brown. 

After a 2-season spell in Birmingham Lewis would go on to join Luctonians RFC, whilst also becoming Head Coach at Malvern College Independent School. 

In September 2020 Lewis would be appointed as the Head of Rugby at Royal Grammar School Worcester.

Personal
Robert's twin brother James Lewis is also a professional rugby union player.

References

External links
Newport Gwent Dragons profile

Rugby union players from Abergavenny
Welsh rugby union players
Dragons RFC players
London Welsh RFC players
Cardiff Rugby players
Living people
1987 births
Teachers at Royal Grammar School Worcester
Rugby union scrum-halves